Ophonus davatchii is a species of ground beetle in the subfamily Harpalinae, genus Ophonus, and subgenus Ophonus (Metophonus).

References

davatchii
Beetles described in 1981